Leporinus sidlauskasi is a species of fish in the genus Leporinus, it is found in the lower Rio Tocantins in Pará State, Brazil in South America.

Etymology
It is named in honor of Brian L. Sidlauskas (b. 1976), the Curator of Fishes at Oregon State University, for his contributions to the knowledge of the systematics of Anostomidae

References

Taxa named by Heraldo Antonio Britski
Taxa named by José Luis Olivan Birindelli
Taxa described in 2019
Fish described in 2019
Anostomidae